Shri Dwijendra Nath Sharmah, a politician from Indian National Congress party, was a member of the Parliament of India representing Assam in the Rajya Sabha, the upper house of the Indian Parliament from 2002 to 2008.

References

Indian National Congress politicians
Rajya Sabha members from Assam
Living people
Year of birth missing (living people)